was a Japanese samurai and commander of the Sengoku period. He was one of the most important vassals of the Go-Hōjō clan and the salary he got was the highest among Go-Hōjō clan's vassals.

On the occasion of the Siege of Odawara (1590), he insisted on keeping Odawara Castle but later he secretly betrayed  Go-Hōjō clan and tried to join Toyotomi Hideyoshi. After the fall of the Go-Hōjō clan, he was ordered to seppuku by Toyotomi Hideyoshi. On the other hand, his second son Matsuda Hideharu became a vassal of Maeda Toshiie.

His cousin Matsuda Yasunaga died in the siege of Yamanaka Castle in 1590.

References

Samurai
1590 deaths
Go-Hōjō clan
Suicides by seppuku